Jaedicke is a surname. Notable people with the surname include:

Meghan Jaedicke (born 1997), German canoeist
Robert K. Jaedicke (1929–2020), American academic

See also
Jaenicke